Maja Škorić (born 10 November 1989) is a Serbian professional basketball player for KSC Szekszárd of the Hungarian First League and the EuroCup Women. She represents Serbia national team internationally.

Playing career
Škorić played for Čelarevo, Hemofarm (Serbia), Aluinvent Miskolc (Hungary), ŠBK Šamorín (Slovakia), VBW CEKK Ceglèd (Hungary) and Basket Landes (France).

National team career
Škorić was a member of the Serbia national team that participated at the EuroBasket Women 2017 in the Czech Republic. Over four tournament games, she averaged 4.5 points, 3.8 rebounds and 1.2 assists per game. She was a member of the national team that won bronze medal at the EuroBasket Women 2019 in Serbia. Over five tournament games, she averaged 2.8 points and 1.2 rebounds per game.

References

External links 
 Maja Skoric at eurobasket.com

1989 births
Living people
Serbs of Croatia
Basketball players from Rijeka
Serbian women's basketball players
Serbian women's 3x3 basketball players
Small forwards
ŽKK Vršac players
European champions for Serbia
Serbian expatriate basketball people in Hungary
Serbian expatriate basketball people in France
Serbian expatriate basketball people in Slovakia
Croatian expatriate basketball people in Serbia
Olympic basketball players of Serbia
Basketball players at the 2020 Summer Olympics